Steven Wynn Jones (born 23 October 1964) is a Welsh former professional footballer who played as a left-back. He made appearances in the English Football League for Wrexham. He also played for Runcorn.

References

1964 births
Living people
Welsh footballers
Association football defenders
Wrexham A.F.C. players
Runcorn F.C. Halton players
English Football League players
Footballers from Wrexham